Fort Omaha, originally known as Sherman Barracks and then Omaha Barracks, is an Indian War-era United States Army supply installation.  Located at 5730 North 30th Street, with the entrance at North 30th and Fort Streets in modern-day North Omaha, Nebraska, the facility is primarily occupied by the Metropolitan Community College.  A Navy Operational Support Center and Marine Corps Reserve unit, along with an Army Reserve unit occupy the periphery of the  fort. The government deeded all but four parcels of the land to the Metropolitan Community College in 1974.

The post is where Ponca Chief Standing Bear and 29 fellow Ponca were held prior to the landmark 1879 trial of Standing Bear v. Crook. Judge Elmer Dundy determined that American Indians were persons within the meaning of the law and that the Ponca were illegally detained after leaving the Indian Territory in January 1879. The Fort Omaha historic district is listed on the National Register of Historic Places. The district includes the 1879 General Crook House Museum, as well as the 1879 Quartermaster's office, 1878 commissary, 1884 guardhouse, 1883 ordnance magazine and 1887 mule stables.

About
Opened in 1868 as a supply depot for various forts along the Platte River, Fort Omaha is primarily occupied by the Metropolitan Community College.<ref>(n.d.) Fort Omaha HistoricOmaha.Com</ref>  It continues to house Navy, Marine and Army Reserve units. The fort is located in the present-day Miller Park neighborhood of North Omaha. The site includes the General Crook House, which is listed separately on the National Register of Historic Places (NRHP).  The entire fort is listed as an historic district on the NRHP.

History
Sherman Barracks, also known as Camp Sherman, was established on December 5, 1868 by Captain William Sinclair of the 3rd U.S. Artillery and named in honor of Lt. General William Tecumseh Sherman. Pioneer entrepreneur Augustus Kountze sold land for the installation to the federal government. The following year, the name was changed to Omaha Barracks. General Sherman was said to have complained about such a small site being named after him.

On December 30, 1878, the post was designated Fort Omaha. During this same time period, the U.S. Army's Department of the Platte was organized. The fort was the department's headquarters from 1878 to 1881. The post, however, remained home to upwards of ten companies of the 2nd Infantry until 1896, when the garrison was relocated to Fort Crook near Bellevue.

Fort Omaha was the site where Chief Standing Bear was held prior to the 1879 trial of Standing Bear v. Crook''. Standing Bear, a Ponca chief, successfully argued in the U.S. District Court that Native Americans were "persons within the meaning of the law" and had rights of citizenship.  During the trial, Standing Bear was assisted by Susette LaFlesche Tibbles, a famous Omaha woman who was the daughter of Iron Eye, the last recognized chief of the Omaha.  His lawyer was Andrew Jackson Poppleton, a pioneer Omaha attorney who held the position of general attorney for the Union Pacific Railroad. The trial was the most important of Poppleton's career. Both the fort's significant role in US military history in relation to the Indian Wars, and this important civil rights trial, contributed to the site's being listed as a historic district on the National Register of Historic Places.

The Spanish–American War brought the fort into usage as a muster point for troops from across Nebraska. Camp Meiklejohn, Camp Augur and Camp Vincent were all subordinate troop sites around Omaha under command of the fort.

In World War II, Fort Omaha was used as a prisoner-of-war camp to house Italian Army soldiers captured in Europe.

Notable personnel
Major General George Crook
Major General Stuart Heintzelman
Brigadier General Dan Christie Kingman
Brigadier General George G. Lundberg

Fort Omaha Balloon School
In 1907, the Army built a large steel hangar at Fort Omaha for use in experiments with dirigibles, a program that was abandoned in 1909. This program and its successor were part of the American Expeditionary Forces. A balloon house was built in 1908, and in 1909, the first balloon flight took place.  The military acquired additional space for training called Florence Field, at the corner of North 30th and Martin Streets in North Omaha.

Shortly after the United States entered World War I, 800 men immediately enlisted in the Aviation Section, U.S. Signal Corps. They were sent to the Fort Omaha Balloon School for training. They later provided forward observations for the artillery. More than 16,000 airmen went through the Balloon School.

In 1917, the Army determined that weather conditions at Fort Omaha were not suitable for rapidly training balloon companies. The next year, a contingent of officers and men from Fort Omaha were assigned to Camp John Wise in Texas. The Balloon School at Fort Omaha was soon ended. Meanwhile, at the Florence Field site on May 2, 1918, two soldiers were burned to death and thirteen seriously burned when a Caquot-type balloon exploded.

Notable personnel
Major Charles DeF. Chandler
Captain Frank Purdy Lahm
Lieutenant Thomas Selfridge
Lieutenant Benjamin Foulois
Lieutenant Kent Curtis

Historic District
There are six extant 19th-century structures in Fort Omaha, and the site overall has been judged significant in US history.  Because of this, Fort Omaha has received numerous historical designations. The Department of the Interior designated Fort Omaha a historic district, and listed the Crook House on the National Register of Historic Places. In 1982, the Fort Omaha Guardhouse was designated a Landmark under the City of Omaha's Landmark Heritage Preservation Ordinance.

General Crook House

In 1879, this Italianate-style house was completed for General and Mrs. Crook for the general's continued administration of the Indian Wars. Today, it is used as the museum of the Douglas County Historical Society.  It is filled with 19th-century Victorian-style furniture, in addition to military exhibits, and offices of the Douglas County Historical Society.  Ornate Victorian-style gardens have been restored on the property.  It is located in the middle of Fort Omaha, at 5730 North 30th Street. It was listed on the National Register of Historic Places in 1969.

Headquarters building
Built in 1879 by the U.S. Army, the Headquarters Building at Fort Omaha first served as the home of the Department of the Platte during the command of General George Crook. In 1881, the headquarters moved back to Downtown Omaha to be closer to the railroads. Today, the building serves as the community college's library.

Guardhouse

Originally constructed in 1861, the current guardhouse, which sits at Bourke Gate, was built in 1883. Expanded several times, it was designated an Omaha Landmark in 1982.

Current usage
After World War II, Fort Omaha was placed under control of the US Navy. Today, several perimeter facilities are used as a training locations for the Marine Corps Reserve, as well as storage and repair areas for Navy vehicles. The remainder of Fort Omaha houses a campus of the Metropolitan Community College, in addition to the Douglas County Historical Society at the General Crook House and Library Archives Center.

See also
 American observation balloon service in World War I
 History of military ballooning
 Nebraska Territory
 United States Army World War I Flight Training

References

Further reading

External links

 
History of Fort Omaha at Douglas County Historical Society
Fort Omaha historic photos at Omaha Public Library
Historic photos of Fort Omaha at Nebraska Memories
Historic photos of the Fort Omaha Balloon School at Nebraska Memories

1868 establishments in Nebraska
Buildings and structures in Omaha, Nebraska
Forts along the Missouri River
Omaha
Omaha
Historic districts in Omaha, Nebraska
Historic districts on the National Register of Historic Places in Nebraska
History of United States expansionism
Landmarks in North Omaha, Nebraska
Military history of the United States during World War I
National Register of Historic Places in Omaha, Nebraska
Tourist attractions in Omaha, Nebraska
World War I airfields in the United States
World War I sites in the United States
World War II sites in the United States
Government buildings completed in 1868